Uroptychus is a genus of squat lobsters in the family Chirostylidae found across the Indo-Pacific. The genus Uroptychus contains the following species:

Uroptychus acostalis Baba, 1988
Uroptychus aguayoi Chace, 1939
Uroptychus alcocki Ahyong & Poore, 2004
Uroptychus alius Baba, 2005
Uroptychus altus Baba, 2005
Uroptychus amabilis Baba, 1979
Uroptychus anacaena Baba & Lin, 2008
Uroptychus anatonus Baba & Lin, 2008
Uroptychus armatus (A. Milne-Edwards, 1880)
Uroptychus atlanticus Baba & Wicksten, 2017
Uroptychus australis (Henderson, 1885)
Uroptychus babai Ahyong & Poore, 2004
Uroptychus bacillimanus Alcock & Anderson, 1899
Uroptychus bellus Faxon, 1893
Uroptychus belos Ahyong & Poore, 2004
Uroptychus bicavus Baba & de Saint Laurent, 1992
Uroptychus bispinatus Baba, 1988
Uroptychus bouvieri Caullery, 1896
Uroptychus brachydactylus Tirmizi, 1964
Uroptychus brevipes Baba, 1990
Uroptychus brevirostris Van Dam, 1933
Uroptychus brevis Benedict, 1902
Uroptychus brevisquamatus Baba, 1988
Uroptychus brucei Baba, 1986
Uroptychus calcar Ahyong & Poore, 2004
Uroptychus capillatus Benedict, 1902
Uroptychus cardus Ahyong & Poore, 2004
Uroptychus cartesi Baba & Macpherson, 2012
Uroptychus cavirostris Alcock & Anderson, 1899
Uroptychus chacei (Baba, 1986)
Uroptychus ciliatus (Van Dam, 1933)
Uroptychus comptus Baba, 1988
Uroptychus concolor (A. Milne-Edwards & Bouvier, 1894)
Uroptychus convexus Baba, 1988
Uroptychus crassior Baba, 1990
Uroptychus crassipes Van Dam, 1939
Uroptychus crosnieri Baba, 1990
Uroptychus cyrano Poore & Andreakis, 2011
Uroptychus dentatus Balss, 1913
Uroptychus edisonicus Baba & Williams, 1998
Uroptychus empheres Ahyong & Poore, 2004
Uroptychus ensirostris Parisi, 1917
Uroptychus faxianae sp. nov.
Uroptychus flindersi Ahyong & Poore, 2004
Uroptychus fornicatus Chace, 1942
Uroptychus foulisi Kensley, 1977
Uroptychus fusimanus Alcock & Anderson, 1899
Uroptychus glaber Baba, 1981
Uroptychus gordonae Tirmizi, 1964
Uroptychus gracilimanus (Henderson, 1885)
Uroptychus granulatus Benedict, 1902
Uroptychus hamatus Khodkina, 1981
Uroptychus hesperius Ahyong & Poore, 2004
Uroptychus inclinis Baba, 2005
Uroptychus indicus Alcock, 1901
Uroptychus insignis (Henderson, 1885)
Uroptychus intermedius (A. Milne-Edwards, 1880)
Uroptychus jamaicensis Benedict, 1902
Uroptychus japonicus Ortmann, 1892
Uroptychus joloensis Van Dam, 1939
Uroptychus kaitara Schnabel, 2009
Uroptychus laperousazi Ahyong & Poore, 2004
Uroptychus latirostris Yokoya, 1933
Uroptychus latus Ahyong & Poore, 2004
Uroptychus levicrustus Baba, 1988
Uroptychus litosus Ahyong & Poore, 2004
Uroptychus liui sp. nov.
Uroptychus longicheles Ahyong & Poore, 2004
Uroptychus longioculus Baba, 1990
Uroptychus longior Baba, 2005
Uroptychus longvae Ahyong & Poore, 2004
Uroptychus magnispinatus Baba, 1977
Uroptychus maori Borradaile, 1916
Uroptychus marianicus sp. nov.
Uroptychus maroccanus Türkay, 1976
Uroptychus mauritius Baba, 2005
Uroptychus minutus Benedict, 1902
Uroptychus multispinosus Ahyong & Poore, 2004
Uroptychus murrayi Tirmizi, 1964
Uroptychus nanophyes McArdle, 1901
Uroptychus naso Van Dam, 1933
Uroptychus nigricapillis Alcock, 1901
Uroptychus nitidus (A. Milne-Edwards, 1880)
Uroptychus novaezealandiae Borradaile, 1916
Uroptychus occidentalis Faxon, 1893
Uroptychus occultispinatus Baba, 1988
Uroptychus onychodactylus Tirmizi, 1964
Uroptychus orientalis]] Baba & Lin, 2008
Uroptychus oxymerus Ahyong & Baba, 2004
Uroptychus paenultimus Baba, 2005
Uroptychus paku Schnabel, 2009
Uroptychus paracrassior Ahyong & Poore, 2004
Uroptychus parilis Cabezas, Lin & Chan, 2012
Uroptychus parvulus (Henderson, 1885)
Uroptychus patulus Ahyong & Poore, 2004
Uroptychus pilosus Baba, 1981
Uroptychus pinocchio Poore & Andreakis, 2011
Uroptychus politus (Henderson, 1885)
Uroptychus princeps Benedict, 1902
Uroptychus pronus Baba, 2005
Uroptychus pubescens Faxon, 1893
Uroptychus raymondi Baba, 2000
Uroptychus remotispinatus Baba & Tirmizi, 1979
Uroptychus rubrovittatus (A. Milne-Edwards, 1881)
Uroptychus rugosus (A. Milne-Edwards, 1880)
Uroptychus rutua Schnabel, 2009
Uroptychus sagamiae Baba, 2005
Uroptychus scambus Benedict, 1902
Uroptychus scandens Benedict, 1902
Uroptychus setosidigitalis Baba, 1977
Uroptychus setosipes Baba, 1981
Uroptychus sexspinosus Balss, 1913
Uroptychus sibogae Van Dam, 1933
Uroptychus simiae Kensley, 1977
Uroptychus similis Baba, 1977
Uroptychus singularis Baba & Lin, 2008
Uroptychus siraji Tirmizi, 1964
Uroptychus soyomaruae Baba, 1981
Uroptychus spiniger Benedict, 1902
Uroptychus spinimanus Tirmizi, 1964
Uroptychus spinirostris (Ahyong & Poore, 2004)
Uroptychus spinosus (A. Milne-Edwards & Bouvier, 1894)
Uroptychus sternospinosus Tirmizi, 1964
Uroptychus subsolanus Ahyong & Poore, 2004
Uroptychus suluensis Van Dam, 1933
Uroptychus thermalis Baba & de Saint Laurent, 1992
Uroptychus toka Schnabel, 2009
Uroptychus tomentosus Baba, 1974
Uroptychus transparens sp. nov.
Uroptychus triangularis Miyake & Baba, 1967
Uroptychus tridentatus (Henderson, 1885)
Uroptychus uncifer (A. Milne-Edwards, 1880)
Uroptychus undecimspinosus Kensley, 1977
Uroptychus valdiviae Balss, 1913
Uroptychus vandamae Baba, 1988
Uroptychus webberi Schnabel, 2009
Uroptychus wolffi Baba, 2005
Uroptychus xipholepis Van Dam, 1933
Uroptychus yaldwyni Schnabel, 2009
Uroptychus yokoyai Ahyong & Poore, 2004
Uroptychus zeidleri Ahyong & Poore, 2004
Uroptychus zezuensis Kim, 1972

References

External links

Squat lobsters